The Royal English College of Valladolid is a residence and training centre located in Valladolid, Spain, for the training of Catholic priests for the English and Welsh Mission. It is under the patronage of St Alban. It was founded with the permission of King Philip II of Spain by the English priest Robert Persons in 1589, during the English Reformation.

The College was run by the Jesuits until their expulsion from Spain in 1767. This created a crisis for the College, which was bereft of faculty and students in one blow. Bishop Richard Challoner, Vicar Apostolic in London, was instrumental in securing the future of the College by amalgamating the three existing English Colleges in Madrid, Seville, and Valladolid, and securing staff from the English Mission and students from the English College at Douay.

Today, men of varying ages and backgrounds spend an introductory year in Valladolid, to discern their vocation and begin formation for Catholic priesthood.  They are exposed to spiritual and human formation, which roots their faith in Jesus Christ, and prepares them to go on to seminaries in the United Kingdom or Ireland, or to Rome or elsewhere.

Our Lady Vulnerata

The image of Our Lady venerated in the College Chapel is that of La Vulnerata, or The Wounded One. The story of the Vulnerata goes back centuries; but in 1596, as Spain was gathering a fleet in the city of Cadiz, the Earl of Essex together with Sir Walter Raleigh led an English fleet into the harbour, defeated the Spanish fleet and sacked the city. Some of the English troops started a riot and dragged a statue of the Virgin Mother and Child from a church to the market square where they desecrated it. They cut off both arms, and all that remained of the child were parts of his tiny feet on his mother’s knee.

The mutilated statue was taken to Madrid, and given a place of honour in a private chapel of a Countess. The priests and seminarians of the English College in Valladolid asked the Countess if they might make reparation for the behaviour of their fellow countrymen who had desecrated the statue. She agreed and the statue was brought to Valladolid and installed with great solemnity in the College Chapel in 1600.

Every year during Holy Week the statue is processed along the street, where it is met by a huge paso or float, which has a large depiction of the Crucified Christ resting on top of it. The two images meet, and dance to each other for a brief period—then the Vulnerata comes back to the College.

College Martyrs
The following alumni of the College gave their lives as martyrs for the Catholic Faith during the Protestant Reformation in England and Wales:

English College, Seville
The College inherited the assets of the English College of St Gregory, Seville upon the closure of the latter:  the Seville College had been founded by Robert Persons in 1592, was bankrupt by 1645, and was closed on the expulsion of the Jesuits from Spain in 1767.

See also 
 English College, Douai
 English College, Rome
 List of Jesuit sites

References

External links
 Official website

Universities and colleges in Valladolid
Seminaries and theological colleges in Spain
1589 establishments in Spain
Catholic Church in England and Wales
Catholic seminaries
Spain–United Kingdom relations
Valladolid